The false lanternshark or false pygmy shark (Etmopterus pseudosqualiolus) is a shark of the family Etmopteridae found in the western Pacific from the Norfolk Ridge and Lord Howe Ridge off New Caledonia.

References

 
 Compagno, Dando, & Fowler, Sharks of the World, Princeton University Press, New Jersey 2005 

Etmopterus
Taxa named by Peter R. Last
Taxa named by George H. Burgess
Taxa named by Bernard Séret
Fish described in 2002